was a nineteenth-century Japanese farmer and religious leader. She is the primary figure of the Japanese new religion Tenrikyo. Followers, who refer to her as Oyasama (おやさま), believe that she was settled as the Shrine of Tsukihi from the moment she experienced a divine revelation in 1838 until her death in 1887.

Upon her divine revelation, she gave away most of her family's possessions and dismantled the family's house, thereby entering a state of poverty. She began to attract followers, who believed that she was a living goddess who could heal people and bless expectant mothers with safe childbirth. To leave a record of her teachings, she composed the Ofudesaki and taught the lyrics, choreography and music of the Service, which have become Tenrikyo's scripture and liturgy respectively. She identified what she claimed to be the place where God created human beings and instructed her followers to mark the place with a pillar and perform the liturgy around it, which she believed would advance humankind toward the salvific state of the Joyous Life. In the last several years of her life, she and her followers were arrested and detained a number of times by the Japanese authorities for forming a religious group without official authorization. A year after her death, Tenrikyo Church Headquarters received official authorization to be a church under the Shinto Main Bureau.

Tenrikyo doctrine maintains that Nakayama Miki was the fulfillment of God's promise to humankind at creation, which was that after a certain number of years had elapsed, God would be revealed through the soul of the mother of humankind at the place of creation and inform humankind of its origins, purpose, and means of salvation. Doctrine also maintains that as the Shrine of God, Nakayama's words and actions were in complete accordance with the divine will and that upon her death, her soul withdrew from physical existence and became everliving.

Biography

Childhood
Nakayama Miki, née Maegawa, was born on 18 April 1798 (2 June) at dawn, around five o'clock in the morning. She was born in Sanmaiden Village, Yamabe County, Yamato Province, or present day Tenri, Nara, to a family of the farming class. Her father Maegawa Hanshichi was a member of the Tōdō clan and held the title of musokunin, a samurai-like status which entitled him to have a surname and carry a sword, though without stipend. He was also an ojoya, a head of a group of local villages. Her mother, Kinu, was from the Nagao family of the same village and was said to have excelled in needlework.

In the first decade of her life, Miki learned how to write with a brush from her father and how to sew and spin cotton from her mother. From the ages of nine to eleven, she attended a private school for children at a nearby village, where she was educated in reading and writing. At home, she learned needlework from her mother and became proficient enough to make handicraft items and to cut garments out of wide bolts of cotton.

The Maegawas were pious adherents of the Pure Land school of Buddhism and belonged to a local temple. In her childhood, Miki became familiar enough with Buddhist prayer so that by the age of twelve or thirteen, she was able to recite from memory various sutras as well the hymns from the Jōdo Wasan. At that time, she expressed an interest in becoming a nun. However, Miki's parents, on the suggestion of Miki's aunt, Kinu, asked her to marry Nakayama Zenbei, the son of Miki's aunt. At first, Miki hesitated to agree to the request out of her desire to become a nun, but eventually she consented, on the condition that even when married she would be allowed to continue her Buddhist prayer.

Marriage
On 15 September 1810 (13 October), Miki took part in her bridal procession to the residence of the Nakayama family in the village of Shoyashiki. Dressed in a long-sleeved kimono, she was carried in a palanquin and was accompanied by attendants carrying a trousseau of five loads – two chests of drawers, two long chests, and a pair of boxes. The Nakayama family, like the Maegawa family, held some prestige in the local area. The custom in Shoyashiki was for the male head of the Nakayama household to inherit the post of toshiyori (village head), and in Miki's lifetime, her father-in-law Zenyemon, and later, her husband Zenbei served as toshiyori. In addition, the Nakayama family was a major landholder in the village.

In 1813, Miki's in-laws entrusted her with the management of all household affairs. The Life of Oyasama, Tenrikyo's biography of Miki, portrays her as a diligent and productive worker. According to its account she did every type of farm work except for the men's tasks of digging ditches and plowing rice fields, pulled more than half an acre of cotton a day, and wove fabrics twice as fast as the average woman.

In the spring of 1816, she completed a training course known as the Fivefold Transmission at Zenpuku Temple, her parish temple in Magata Village (now a district of the city of Tenri). During the Fivefold Transmission, she attended lectures on the writings of Hōnen, meditated, underwent tonsure, and made a vow to repeat the nenbutsu for the remainder of her life. Those who enrolled in the Fivefold Transmission were initiated into the mysteries of the Pure Land sect and were considered to have reached the highest level of faith.

In June 1820, Nakayama Zenyemon, Miki's father-in-law, died at the age of sixty-two. In July 1821, Miki's first child, also named Zenyemon (later renamed Shuji) was born. Her first daughter Omasa and second daughter Oyasu were born in April 1825 and September 1827 respectively. In April 1828, Miki's mother-in-law Kinu, died.

The anecdotes from The Life of Oyasama depict Miki as a charitable and forgiving mother. When a man was caught stealing a bag of rice from the Nakayama family's storehouse, Miki allowed him to keep the rice instead of turning him in to the authorities. When the mothers in her village suffered from a lack of milk, she would offer to nurse their infants. In 1828, one of the infants she was nursing, a boy named Adachi Terunojo, contracted smallpox. To pray for his recovery, she underwent a hundred-day prayer, walking barefoot to the village shrine every day.

In 1830, Miki's second daughter Oyasu died. Her third daughter, Oharu, was born on 21 September 1831. Her fourth daughter, Otsune, was born on 7 November 1833 and died two years later in 1835. Her fifth daughter, Kokan, was born on 15 December 1837.

Revelation
On 26 October 1837, Nakayama Miki's eldest son, Shūji, felt an acute pain in his leg while sowing barley in the fields. A village doctor named Gensuke was summoned to treat the leg. When Shūji's condition did not improve, the family called for Nakatano Ichibei, a shugenja (ascetic monk) who was renowned in the area for his healing rituals. Ichibei offered prayers on three occasions, but after each time Shūji had only temporary relief before the pain returned. After Zenbei, Miki's husband, made another entreaty to Ichibei, he agreed to conduct an incantation (yosekaji), a ritual intended to invoke the Buddha's compassion. Over the course of a year, the incantation was conducted nine times.

When Miki and Zenbei had sudden physical pains on the evening of 23 October 1838, Zenbei sent a messenger to Ichibei, who on that day was visiting his relatives in Shoyashiki for a local festival. Ichibei held another incantation the following morning. However, as the woman who regularly served as his medium, Soyo, was not available, he asked Miki to serve as medium instead. In the middle of the incantation, Tenrikyo's doctrine asserts that Miki had her first divine revelation.

After the first revelation, Miki remained in a trance while the Nakayama family discussed how to respond to the request. Over three days, the family made several refusals, asking the divine presence to leave, but with each refusal Miki's trance grew in intensity and her responses became more severe. Then, at eight o'clock on the morning on 26 October 1838, Miki's husband Zenbei accepted the invitation on the family's behalf and her trance stopped. On this day, according to Tenrikyo's doctrine, Nakayama Miki was settled as the Shrine of Tsukihi and the Tenrikyo teachings were founded.

Poverty and ministry

For the three years or so following the revelation, Miki secluded herself in a storehouse. In the 1840s, Miki gradually gave away her personal belongings and the possessions of the Nakayama family. Then Miki requested that her husband Zenbei dismantle the main house, starting with the roof tiles at the southeast corner followed by the tiles on the northeast corner and the gable walls.

In 1848, she began to give sewing lessons at her home, and in 1852 her daughter Oharu was married to Kajimoto Sojiro, the younger brother of one of the sewing students. Around this time, her son Shūji opened a classroom at home and began to instruct the village children in reading and writing.

On 22 February 1853, Miki's husband Zenbei died. In the same year, the dismantling of the Nakayama house was completed, and Miki sent her youngest daughter Kokan to Naniwa (in present day Osaka) to chant the divine name, thus marking the first instance of missionary work in the Tenrikyo tradition.

In 1854, Miki began to administer the grant of safe childbirth (obiya-yurushi), first to her daughter Oharu during her  pregnancy. After Oharu delivered the baby safely, expectant mothers who had heard about the grant visited the Nakayama residence and requested that the grant be administered to them as well. The grant, a form of faith healing, was conducted by stroking and breathing on the recipient's stomach three times. Recipients of the grant, Miki instructed, would be assured of a rapid and easy delivery and would not need to observe the postnatal customs of the day, such as wearing an abdominal band, not eating certain foods, or leaning against a support.

Scripture and liturgy

In 1864, Iburi Izō, a carpenter and a close disciple of Oyasama, constructed Tenrikyo's first house of worship, the Place for the Service (tsutome no basho).

From 1866 to 1875, Miki taught the Mikagura-uta, the songs of Tenrikyo's liturgy, the Service. The Mikagura-uta is divided into five sections; sections one, two and three are performed seated with hand movements while sections four and five are dances. Section one was composed first, in 1866, followed by section five from January to August 1867. In 1870, sections two and four were composed, followed by section three in 1875.

From 1869 to 1882, Miki composed what would later be called the Ofudesaki, a Tenrikyo scripture believed to contain her divine revelations. The Ofudesaki was written in the hiragana script and in the waka style of Japanese poetry, and has since been compiled into 1,711 verses divided into seventeen parts.

In 1874, Miki collected the kagura masks she had requested from her older brother Maegawa Kyosuke. The kagura masks would be used for the Kagura Service, a subset of the Service.

On 26 May 1875 (29 June), Miki located the Jiba, where she claimed was the spot where God created human beings. According to The Life of Oyasama, she identified the spot by walking randomly around the yard of her residence until her foot stopped. To confirm, she asked the other followers who were present to walk around blindfolded and their feet stopped at the same spot. She instructed her followers to mark this spot with a stand called the Kanrodai, or the stand of heavenly dew.  Later that year, a wooden prototype of the Kanrodai, built by Iburi Izō two years earlier on Miki's request, was brought out of the storehouse of the Nakayama residence and placed on the Jiba.

In 1877, Miki taught the women's instruments to be used in the liturgy – shamisen, kokyū, and koto. On 26 August 1880 (30 September), the liturgy was performed for the first time with the full set of instruments.

In 1881, the construction of a stone version of the Kanrodai commenced with a search for stones in a nearby village. In May and September of the same year, the first and second layers of the stand, respectively, were put into place. However, in March 1882, the chief of the Nara police station confiscated the two layers, a measure taken to prevent the performance of the Service the next day. In the same year, Miki expressed her regret over the confiscation in the final verses of the Ofudesaki, completed that year, and made revisions to sections one and three of the Mikagura-uta.

Persecution
An early instance of persecution occurred in 1866, when several yamabushi monks caused a disturbance at Miki's residence and filed a complaint to the local magistrate's office regarding the activities taking place there. The magistrate's office questioned Miki and her followers and advised them to obtain government authorization first before continuing their activities. Miki's son Shūji went to the Yoshida Administrative Office of Shinto in Kyoto and received government authorization in 1867. However, the authorization became invalid in 1870 when the Yoshida Administrative Office was terminated by the recently installed Meiji government.

In 1876, Miki's son Shūji obtained a license to operate a steam bath and inn as a pretense to allow more followers to gather without arousing suspicion from the police.

Death

Miki died on 26 January 1887. Tenrikyo was said to have 30,000 followers at the time of her death.

The Life of Oyasama

The Life of Oyasama, Foundress of Tenrikyo is the biography of Nakayama Miki published by Tenrikyo Church Headquarters.

Background
Efforts to compile a biography of Nakayama Miki began not long after her death in 1887. An instruction recorded in the Osashizu, dated 13 October 1890, requested that the followers produce a record of Nakayama's life. In response to this request, Nakayama Shinnosuke, the first Shinbashira, supervised the composition of the script for the Besseki lectures, which was completed in 1896. Based on this script, Nakayama Shinnosuke wrote a biography dated 3 July 1898 (referred to as the katakana version) and another one around 1907 (the hiragana version). Nakayama Shinnosuke's hiragana version became the basis of future biography compilations including The Life of Oyasama. 

Besides Nakayama Shinnosuke's writings, a number of other writings containing biographical information were produced by various individuals. When the Tenrikyo followers made a written request in December 1886 to establish a church, four early Tenrikyo leaders – Kōda Chūsaburō, Shimizu Yonosuke, Moroi Kunisaburō, and Masuno Shōbei – submitted Saisho no yurai (最初之由来) along with the request. In 1891, Hashimoto Kiyoshi wrote Tenrikyōkai yurai ryakki (天理教会由来略記), which was written to be submitted to groups outside the church. During the church's efforts to obtain sectarian independence at the turn of the century, Tenrikyo Church Headquarters commissioned biographies from non-Tenrikyo writers, Udagawa Bunkai in 1900 and Nakanishi Ushirō in 1902. Around this time Tenrikyo followers such as Okutani Bunchi and Masuno Michioki independently wrote biographies as well.

In 1925, the Department of Doctrine and Historical Materials was founded. The department gathered historical materials and produced "The Life of Oyasama; with Revised Historical Data" (御教祖伝史実校訂本) around 1936. This was later published in volumes 29, 30, 32, 37, and 47 of the journal Fukugen (復元).

Compilation
In 1952, a group of scholars of Tenrikyo Church Headquarters known as the "Kōki Committee" began to prepare a number of drafts of Oyasama's biography. In so doing, they decided to use the research of Nakayama Shinnosuke as the primary historical reference. The first draft was put together by an early Tenrikyo theologian, Ueda Yoshinaru, in the same year. All drafts from the first draft to the seventeenth draft (released 26 August 1955) were referred to as Tenrikyō kyōso den sōan (天理教教祖伝草案).

The eighteenth draft was prepared on 18 October 1955. From this draft to the twenty-second draft (17 March 1956) are referred to as  Tenrikyō kyōso den kōan (天理教教祖伝稿案). After the release of the twenty-first draft in February 1956, the "16th Doctrinal Seminar" was held to discuss aspects of the draft that still needed improvement. Upon revision of the twenty-second draft, The Life of Oyasama, Foundress of Tenrikyo was published on October 26, 1956. 

Since its first publication, The Life of Oyasama has gone through two revisions. The first revision, published on 26 December 1981, made several historical corrections and additions. The second revision, published on 26 January 1986, changed certain expressions deemed unsuitable.

The English translation has gone through three editions, the first in 1967, the second in 1982, and the third in 1996.

Perspectives

Historical

Theological

Notes

References

Citations

Bibliography

Further reading

External links
 "Tenrikyō" from World Religions & Spirituality Project
 Religious Movements page
 Oyasama, the Foundress of Tenrikyo Tenrikyo International Website
 Tenrikyo Europe Centre

1798 births
1887 deaths
18th-century Japanese people
19th-century Japanese people
18th-century Japanese women
19th-century Japanese women
Founders of new religious movements
Japanese religious leaders
People from Nara Prefecture
Tenrikyo
Japanese Shintoists
Women mystics
Place of birth missing
Place of death missing